Castell'Ottieri is a village in Tuscany, central Italy, administratively a frazione of the comune of Sorano, province of Grosseto, in the tuff area of southern Maremma. At the time of the 2001 census its population amounted to 195.

Castell'Ottieri is about 90 km from Grosseto and 10 km from Sorano, and it is situated along the Provincial Road which links Sorano to Castell'Azzara. Ancient capital of the small County of Ottieri, Castell'Ottieri is now a pittoresque Renaissance village.

Main sights 
 San Bartolomeo (16th century), main parish church of the village, it was built in 1590 and contains some Baroque paintings.
 Santa Maria (17th century)
 Rocca degli Ottieri, old castle built by Aldobrandeschis in the Middle Ages, it was re-built during the Renaissance by the Ottieri, as the seat of the county.

References

Bibliography 
  Emanuele Repetti, «Castell'Ottieri», Dizionario Geografico Fisico Storico della Toscana, 1833–1846.
 Aldo Mazzolai, Guida della Maremma. Percorsi tra arte e natura, Florence, Le Lettere, 1997.

See also 
 Cerreto, Sorano
 Elmo, Sorano
 Montebuono, Sorano
 Montevitozzo
 Montorio, Sorano
 San Giovanni delle Contee
 San Quirico, Sorano
 San Valentino, Sorano
 Sovana

Frazioni of Sorano